The Minnesota State Mavericks football program is the intercollegiate American football team for the Minnesota State University, Mankato located in the U.S. state of Minnesota.

The team plays in NCAA Division II and is a member of the Northern Sun Intercollegiate Conference. Since 1962, they have played in Blakeslee Stadium, with a natural grass field and a capacity of 7,000.

The current head coach is Todd Hoffner, who has led Minnesota State to NCAA playoff appearances (2008, 2009, 2014, 2015, 2017, 2018 & 2019) including an appearance at the NCAA National Championship game in 2014 and 2019.

Playoff appearances

NCAA Division II 
The Mavericks have made 13 appearances in the NCAA Division II playoffs. Their combined record is 15–13.

Notable former players
Notable alumni who played in the NFL include:
 Larry Brown
 Bob Bruer
 Tywan Mitchell
 Chris Reed
 Adam Thielen
 Shane Zylstra

References

External links
 

 
American football teams established in 1922
1922 establishments in Minnesota